Trilofo is a village and a community of the Thermi municipality. Before the 2011 local government reform it was part of the municipality of Mikra, of which it was a municipal district. The 2011 census recorded 7,227 inhabitants in the village and 7,405 inhabitants in the community of Trilofo. The community of Trilofo covers an area of 34.875 km2.

Administrative division
The community of Trilofo consists of two separate settlements: 
Ano Scholari (population 178)
Trilofo (population 7,227)
The aforementioned population figures are as of 2011.

See also
 List of settlements in the Thessaloniki regional unit

References

Populated places in Thessaloniki (regional unit)